A presidential referendum was held in Syria on 10 July 2000, following the death of President Hafez al-Assad. The candidate, chosen by the parliament, was his son, Bashar al-Assad, with voters then asked to approve or reject his candidacy. A reported 99.7% of voters voted in favour, with a turnout of 94.6%.

Background
After the death of President Hafez al-Assad on June 10, the Syrian parliament voted to amend the Constitution to lower the minimum age for presidential candidates from 40 to 34, Bashar al-Assad's age at the time.

Results

References

Syria
Presidential
Presidential elections in Syria
Single-candidate elections